The 1980 Tulsa Golden Hurricane football team represented the University of Tulsa during the 1980 NCAA Division I-A football season. In their fourth year under head coach John Cooper, the Golden Hurricane compiled an 8–3 record (4-1 against conference opponents) and won the Missouri Valley Conference championship.

The team's statistical leaders included quarterback Kenny Jackson with 1,208 passing yards, Kenneth Session with 662 rushing yards, and Paul Johns with 420 receiving yards. Head coach John Cooper was later inducted into the College Football Hall of Fame.

Schedule

Roster

References

Tulsa
Tulsa Golden Hurricane football seasons
Missouri Valley Conference football champion seasons
Tulsa Golden Hurricane football